Arthur H. Clark (30 May 1924 – 21 March 2017) was an Australian sculptor from Bundaberg, in Queensland.

Biography
Clark was born in Blandford Forum, Dorset, in the United Kingdom, and migrated to Australia with his family in 1963. Since his retirement in 1983, Clark turned his long interest in woodcraft into an art career, and turned his hand to wood sculpting. His work has appeared in exhibitions in Cologne, Germany, and across Australia.

Awards and exhibitions 

1988 World Expo, Brisbane
1989 Adrian Slinger Gallery, Brisbane 1989

References

20th-century Australian sculptors
1924 births
2017 deaths
People from Blandford Forum
21st-century Australian sculptors
British emigrants to Australia